Surrey Heath is a constituency represented in the House of Commons of the UK Parliament since 2005 by Michael Gove, a Conservative who was the Secretary of State for Levelling Up, Housing and Communities until July 2022, and returned to the office on 25 October 2022. The Home counties suburban constituency is in the London commuter belt, on the outskirts of Greater London. Surrey Heath is in the north west of Surrey and borders the counties of Berkshire and Hampshire.

History
The seat was created in 1997 from the most part of North West Surrey, a seat that was abolished, and smaller parts of Woking and Guildford, seats that remain.

On its creation, Nick Hawkins was elected to parliament as Surrey Heath's MP, after Michael Grylls, who had in 1992 achieved a majority of 28,392, retired. One of Hawkins' opponents for selection was future Speaker John Bercow, selected for Buckingham the same day.

In 1999 then-party chairman Michael Ancram was intervened to prevent a move to deselect Hawkins following local party disquiet about him leaving his wife of 20 years for a local councillor. In 2004, the Conservative constituency association, then the richest in the country, deselected Hawkins for the next election, following accusations of racism, in the hope of obtaining an MP of cabinet calibre.

The MP since 2005, Michael Gove, served in three Conservative governments across multiple departments between 2010 and 2022, lasting 4 years as Secretary of State for Education until 2014, and most recently holding office as the Secretary of State for Levelling Up, Housing and Communities from 2021 until 2022.

Boundaries

Surrey Heath occupies the northwest corner of the county. It has electoral wards:
Bagshot, Bisley, Chobham, Frimley, Frimley Green, Heatherside, Lightwater, Mytchett and Deepcut, Old Dean, Parkside, St Michaels, St Pauls, Town, Watchett, West End, and Windlesham in the Surrey Heath District
Ash South and Tongham, Ash Vale, and Ash Wharf in the Borough of Guildford.

The largest town is Camberley. The Boundary Commission made no boundary changes for Surrey Heath in the Fifth Periodic Review of Westminster constituencies before the 2010 general election.

The large village of Ash with Ash Vale and smaller one of Tongham are contiguous, similar to Frimley and Frimley Green.

Constituency profile
70% of homes were detached or semi-detached at the 2011 census. The detached percentage (45.2%) was at that time the second highest in the South East, behind the New Forest. The area is well connected to London Heathrow Airport, IT, telecommunications and logistics centres of the M3 and M4 corridors, and to the military towns of Aldershot and Sandhurst. Farnborough, with its civil, private aviation base with certain military uses, is also nearby, as is Blackbushe Airport.

Workless claimants, registered jobseekers,  were in November 2012 significantly lower than the national average of 3.8%, at 1.7% of the population based on a statistical compilation by The Guardian.

According to the British Election Study, it was the most right-wing seat in the UK as of 2014.

Constituents on balance voted to leave the European Union in 2016 but an analysis of YouGov polling by Focaldata suggested support for remain rose from 48% then to 50.2% in August 2018.

Until the 2019 general election, the constituency was seen as one of the Conservative Party's safest seats. This election saw an unexpected 16% swing to the Liberal Democrats' candidate Alasdair Pinkerton, polling the second-highest second place since the constituency's creation, with Labour recording the lowest share of the vote since the seat's creation.

Surrey Heath is seen as the Liberal Democrats' 58th target seat, having taken the Conservatives from a majority of 35 on the local council to a majority of one at the 2019 election and pushed the Conservatives to the lowest number of councillors on Guildford Borough Council since its creation in 1973.

Members of Parliament

Elections

Elections in the 2010s

Elections in the 2000s

Elections in the 1990s

See also
List of parliamentary constituencies in Surrey

Notes

References

Sources
Election result, 2010 (BBC)
Election result, 2005 (BBC)
Election results, 1997 - 2001 (BBC)
Election results, 1997 - 2001 (Election Demon)
Election results, 1997 - 2010 (Guardian)

Parliamentary constituencies in South East England
Constituencies of the Parliament of the United Kingdom established in 1997
Politics of Surrey